Bernhard Lippert (born March 12, 1962 in Sailauf) is a German football manager and current technical director of the Ghana Football Association.

Lippert worked between 1994 and 1997 as manager of the Eintracht Frankfurt reserve team, Eintracht Frankfurt Amateure. In 1997, he was promoted as he became assistant manager of the first squad he worked there until 2000. Between December 9 and December 19, 1998 he was caretaker of the SGE. Between 2000 and November 2005 he managed the Amateure again.

External links
 Official profile at affa.az
 Bernhard Lippert at eintracht-archiv.de
 Profile at kleeblatt-chronik.de

1962 births
Living people
German footballers
SpVgg Greuther Fürth players
Rot-Weiss Frankfurt players
German football managers
Eintracht Frankfurt managers
Eintracht Frankfurt non-playing staff
Association football midfielders